Horace King may refer to:

Horace King (architect) (1807–1885), American bridge architect
Horace King (footballer) (1883–1940), English footballer
Horace King, Baron Maybray-King (1901–1986), British politician, Speaker of the House of Commons
Horace King (English cricketer) (1915–1974), English cricketer
Horace King (Barbadian cricketer) (1928–2016), Barbadian cricketer
Horace King (American football) (born 1953), American football player

See also
James Horace King (1873–1955), Canadian physician and parliamentarian